Mampe West Grama Niladhari Division is a Grama Niladhari Division of the Kesbewa Divisional Secretariat  of Colombo District  of Western Province, Sri Lanka .  It has Grama Niladhari Division Code 574.

Piliyandala Clock Tower and Piliyandala Central College  are located within, nearby or associated with Mampe West.

Mampe West is a surrounded by the Mampe East, Kolamunna, Kesbewa North, Mampe North, Mampe South and Vishwakalawa  Grama Niladhari Divisions.

Demographics

Ethnicity 

The Mampe West Grama Niladhari Division has a Sinhalese majority (97.0%) . In comparison, the Kesbewa Divisional Secretariat (which contains the Mampe West Grama Niladhari Division) has a Sinhalese majority (97.3%)

Religion 

The Mampe West Grama Niladhari Division has a Buddhist majority (94.1%) . In comparison, the Kesbewa Divisional Secretariat (which contains the Mampe West Grama Niladhari Division) has a Buddhist majority (93.0%)

Gallery

References 

Grama Niladhari Divisions of Kesbewa Divisional Secretariat